Philip Steven (born 19 January 1995) is a Papua New Guinean footballer who plays as a defender for FC Port Moresby in the Papua New Guinea National Soccer League.

References

1995 births
Living people
Papua New Guinean footballers
Association football defenders
Papua New Guinea international footballers
2016 OFC Nations Cup players